Cosmosoma batesii is a moth of the family Erebidae. It was described by Arthur Gardiner Butler in 1876. It is found in the Brazilian states of Pará and São Paulo.

References

batesii
Moths described in 1876